Mehdi Posti (also Romanized as Mehdī Postī) is a village in Vilkij-e Shomali Rural District, in the Central District of Namin County, Ardabil Province, Iran. At the 2006 census, its population was 172, in 29 families.

References 

Towns and villages in Namin County